Unity Grammar is an independent Islamic co-educational primary and secondary day school, located in Austral, a suburb in south-western Sydney, New South Wales, Australia. The School educates students from Year K to Year 12.

Curriculum 
The Australian Curriculum is designed to help all young Australians to become successful learners, confident and creative individuals, and active and informed citizens. Presented as a developmental sequence of learning from Foundation - Year 10, the Australian Curriculum describes to teachers, parents, students and others in the wider community what is to be taught and the quality of learning expected of young people as they progress through school. (ACARA).

The Junior School curriculum follows the prescribed curriculum, with a focus on individual learning and abilities.

Islamic Studies and Arabic 
The Islamic Studies Curriculum class provides a K–10 Islamic education program specifically designed to meet the needs of Australian Muslim students. The Curriculum reflects the aims and objectives of Unity Grammar in providing a balanced Islamic education.

The college has developed its own K–10 Arabic program with a complete series of K-10 Arabic textbooks. In addition, the program aims to enable students to recognise the relationship between language and culture and appreciate social, geographical and historical contexts.

By utilising multiple sources of classical texts and modern Arabic teaching resources, the program was developed with reference to the Arabic K–10 Syllabus and in accordance with the broad learning outcomes of the K–10 Curriculum Framework set by the New South Wales Education Standards Authority (NESA).

Extracurricular 
Students analyse ideas presented in class activities to assist in illustrating how the knowledge and understanding of STEM can benefit local, national and global community. The college's STEM program focuses on cohesively educating students on each discipline. The STEM initiative has successfully hosted a series of events representing the wide range of concepts and projects involved in STEM education. Unity Grammar is currently a Regional and National Robotics Finalist as well as a competitor in the Robotics World Finals.

At Unity Grammar, PDHPE and Sport are an integral part of a child's development. One component of wellbeing which the college value for its students is physical wellbeing. They intend to further develop students’ physical skills and provide more opportunities to participate in sport. The college offers swimming, cross country and athletics carnivals, as well as enter both individuals and teams in a range of school and club competitions. Unity Grammar also offers numerous sport opportunities for students including formal activities during sport time, sports incursions (such as gymnastics, boxercise and athletics), and excursions (such as swimming and martial arts).

See also

 Education in Australia
 Islam in Australia
 List of Islamic schools in New South Wales

References

Private primary schools in New South Wales
Private secondary schools in Sydney
Educational institutions established in 2008
2008 establishments in Australia
Islamic schools in Sydney